Ugonna Uzochukwu is a Nigerian professional footballer, who plays as a midfielder. He is currently a free agent.

He began his professional football career in his homeland Nigeria for Enugu Rangers.

Club career
Born in Lagos, Nigeria, Uzochukwu started his youth football Anambra Pillars F.C. before booming interest from Enugu Rangerswhere he started his professional football career (a premier division club in Nigeria). He featured regularly for the side, also winning the best Midfielder of the Season in 2015.

Chippa United F.C.
Uzochukwu later made a big move to South African club Chippa United F.C. where he made 20 league appearances and scoring two goals.

Olympique  Club de Khouribga

His talent got the attraction of Moroccan Club Olympique Club de Khouribga which compete in the Botola League in 2016 The North African club signed Uzochukwu on a four-year contract in September 2016.

He signed for Saudi Arabia second tier League club Al-Washm in February 2019.

International career
In January 2014, coach Stephen Keshi, invited him to be included in the Nigeria national football team for the 2014 African Nations Championship. He helped the team to a third-place finish after Nigeria beat Zimbabwe by a goal to nil. He has made nine appearances, scoring two goals for the Nigeria national football team.

International chart

Personal life
Uzochukwu was born in Nigeria to Clifford Uzochukwu and Kate Uzochukwu. He is from a family of five siblings.

Honours

Club
 Enugu Rangers Best Midfielder: 2015
 Enugu Rangers Most Discipline Player of the Season: 2014-2015

References

1991 births
Living people
Nigerian footballers
Nigerian expatriate footballers
Nigerian expatriate sportspeople in South Africa
Nigerian expatriate sportspeople in Morocco
Nigerian expatriate sportspeople in Saudi Arabia
Expatriate soccer players in South Africa
Expatriate footballers in Morocco
Expatriate footballers in Saudi Arabia
Rangers International F.C. players
Chippa United F.C. players
Olympique Club de Khouribga players
Al-Washm Club players
Lobi Stars F.C. players
Nigeria Professional Football League players
South African Premier Division players
Botola players
Saudi First Division League players
Nigeria A' international footballers
Nigerian expatriate sportspeople in Jordan
2014 African Nations Championship players
Association football midfielders
Anambra Pillars F.C. players
Nigeria international footballers
Expatriate footballers in Jordan